The Red Notebook is a story-in-a-story collection by Paul Auster.  The book consists of four parts, all stories which had appeared previously: The Red Notebook (1995), Why Write? (1996), Accident Report (1999) and It Don't Mean a Thing (2000). They are true stories gathered from Auster's life as well as the lives of his friends and acquaintances and they have all one thing in common: the paradox of coincidence. Auster narrates things he writes about in his fiction, making one wonder if he's really telling the truth. Implying that everything and everyone is somehow, mysteriously, connected to each other.

Auster tells about the wrong number that inspired him to write City of Glass, about how he met his childhood hero Willie Mays, but didn't have a pencil with him to get his autograph and how during all four flat tires of his life he had the same passenger in the car with him.

American short story collections
1995 short story collections
Faber and Faber books